Classic Encounters is a 2010 recording by jazz pianist Toshiko Akiyoshi with Reiko Honshoh.

Track listing
 "Toshiko's March" – "Alla Turca: Allegretto in A minor" / Piano Sonata No. 11 (Mozart)
 "2 Part Invention" – Inventions and Sinfonias, No. 4 in D Minor (Bach)
 "Nocturnes, Op. 9, Nr. 2 (Chopin)
 "Joking with Beethoven" – "Piano Sonata Nr. 23" (Beethoven)
 "Arab Dance" – The Nutcracker (Tchaikovsky)
 "Solveig's Song" – Peer Gynt (Grieg)
 "The Dance of Genji Ladies" – "Pavane" (Fauré)
 "Put on the Costume"  "On with the Motley" (Leoncavallo)

Personnel
Toshiko Akiyoshi – piano 
Reiko Honshoh – piano

References
Studio Songs YZSO-10012

Toshiko Akiyoshi albums
2010 albums